Bombardier Aviation is a division of Bombardier Inc. It is headquartered in Dorval, Quebec, Canada.  Its most popular aircraft included the Dash 8 Series 400, CRJ100/200/440, and CRJ700/900/1000 lines of regional airliners, and the newer CSeries. It also manufactured the Bombardier 415 amphibious water-bomber (in Dorval and North Bay), and currently makes the Global Express and the Challenger lines of business jets.

At one time, Bombardier had manufacturing plants in 27 countries, employing over 70,000 workers, but has since trimmed its workforce to less than half and reduced its holdings.

History

Early activities

After acquiring Canadair in 1986 and restoring it to profitability, in 1989 Bombardier acquired the near-bankrupt Short Brothers aircraft manufacturing company in Belfast, Northern Ireland. This was followed in 1990 by the acquisition of the bankrupt American company Learjet, a manufacturer of business jets headquartered in Wichita, Kansas; and finally the money-losing Boeing subsidiary, de Havilland Aircraft of Canada based in Toronto, Ontario in 1992.

The aerospace company accounts for over half of Bombardier Inc.'s revenue. By the start of the 2010s, its most popular aircraft included its Dash 8 Series 400, CRJ100/200/440, and CRJ700/900/1000 lines of regional airliners although the company was devoting most of its Research and Development budget to the newer CSeries. It also manufactured the Bombardier 415 amphibious water-bomber (in Dorval and North Bay), and the Global Express and the Challenger lines of business jets.

The CSeries, which Bombardier offered in several size versions, initially competed with the Airbus A318 and Airbus A319; the Boeing 737 Next Generation 737-600 and 737-700 models; and the Embraer 195. Bombardier claimed the CSeries would burn 20% less fuel per trip than these competitors, which would make it still about 8% more fuel efficient than the Boeing 737 MAX, which was introduced in 2017. The launch customer for the CSeries, Lufthansa, signed a letter of intent for up to 60 aircraft and 30 options in 2008. The Montreal manufacturing complex was redeveloped by Ghafari Associates to incorporate lean manufacturing for the CSeries.

2010–2016
On 24 March 2011, Shanghai-based Commercial Aircraft Corporation of China (Comac) and Bombardier Inc. signed a framework agreement for a long-term strategic cooperation on commercial aircraft. The intention was to break the near-duopoly of Airbus and Boeing. Aircraft covered by the programme included the Bombardier CRJ-series, CSeries and Q-series; and the Comac ARJ21 and Comac C919. In January 2012, the firm began manufacturing simple structures, such as flight controls for the CRJ series, from its first facility in Africa, near Casablanca, Morocco. On 30 September 2013, it broke ground on its permanent facility, due to open late 2014. In October, a joint development deal between Bombardier and a South Korean consortium consisting of Korea Aerospace Industries and Korean Air Lines was revealed, to develop a 90-seater turboprop regional airliner, targeting a 2019 launch date.

In November 2012, Bombardier signed the largest deal in its history with Swiss business jet operator VistaJet for 56 Global series jets for a total value of $3.1 billion, including an option for an additional 86 jets, for a total transaction value of $7.8 billion. In April 2013, Canada's Porter Airlines placed a conditional order for 12 CSeries aircraft, with options for another 18; this was conditional on jets being allowed to use Billy Bishop Toronto City Airport off downtown Toronto. In 2015, the Canadian Government announced that it would not approve the use of jets at the airport and the proposal was shelved.

In January 2014, 1,700 employees were cut from Bombardier Aerospace due to a 19 percent drop in orders in 2013. In July of that year, Bombardier reorganized itself in response to underperformance; President Guy Hachey retired and Bombardier Aerospace was split into three divisions: business aircraft; commercial aircraft and aerostructures; and engineering services, while 1,800 jobs were cut. In its 2014-year end statement, Bombardier Aerospace reported its employee count had reduced by 3,700, delivered 290 aircraft and held orders for 282 more; and also claimed "strong long-term potential". On 29 October 2015, Bombardier announced a US$4.9-billion third-quarter loss and $3.2 billion writedown on the CSeries. It also cancelled its Learjet 85 program, taking another US$1.2-billion writedown and cancelling 64 outstanding orders. The firm's debt reached approximately $9 billion, largely due to the CSeries, which had not recorded a single firm order since September 2014. Bombardier shares fell 17.4 per cent on that day. By 21 December 2015, the firm had 243 firm orders for the CSeries; a US$2.5 billion cash infusion – $1 billion from the provincial government plus a $1.5 billion investment from the Caisse de dépôts et placements du Québec – was keeping the parent company adequately funded.

On 17 February 2016, Bombardier announced its 2015 profits were $138 million before taking a $5.4 billion write-down; it also announced 7,000 jobs would be cut. After a long and expensive development, costing US$5.4 billion to date, including a US$3.2 billion writeoff, the small (110–125 seat) CS100 version of the CSeries received initial type certification from Transport Canada on 18 December 2015. At the time, the company had 243 firm orders and letters of intent and commitment for another 360. Most orders were for the CS300 model. The first CS100 was expected to be flying by mid-2016 in Lufthansa colours. "Certification is a great thing, but 2016 is going to be critical for orders," analyst Chris Murray, a
Managing Director with Alta Corp, told Bloomberg Business. Fred Cromer, president of Bombardier's commercial aircraft unit, hinted on 21 December 2015 that price cuts or other incentives may be offered to bolster sales (list price for the CS100 was US$71.8 million and for the CS300 US$82 million).

Intending to boost profit margins, Bombardier announced on 12 January 2016 that it would cancel deals with third party sales agent Tag Aeronautics, as well as cancelling 24 firm and 30 optional orders, aiming to later resell these aircraft without a sales agency fee. The CSeries was adversely hit by production delays and stiff competition in 2016. On 20 January, United Continental Holdings Inc. announced that it had ordered 40 Boeing 737-700s instead. Air Canada announced it would buy up to 75 CS300s, a larger variant, on 17 February 2016; prior to this, there had been no CSeries orders since 2014. The CSeries program was forecast to have positive cash flow after delivering approximately 200 aircraft. David Tyerman, an analyst with Canaccord Genuity, commented on the difficulty of winning orders and questioned how profitable the next CSeries order will be. According to Bjorn Fehrm of the aviation consulting firm Leeham Company, the first 15 CSeries built in 2016 each cost $60 million to make, but would sell for only $30 million.

Bombardier held negotiation with Delta Air Lines, the latter placing an order in April 2016 for 75 CS100 models with an option for 50 additional aircraft. At full list price, the deal would total US$5.6 billion; sources claimed that Delta had received a significant discount. Air Canada firmed up its tentative order for 45 CS300s with an option for another 30 in June 2016; it was reportedly valued at $3.8 billion, increasing to $6.3 billion if the option was exercised (based on the aircraft's list price). The next day, Bombardier delivered the first CSeries jet to Swiss International Air Lines, the first operator to start flying them.

Government subsidy controversies

Embraer 

Brazil and Canada engaged in an international, adjudicated trade dispute over government subsidies to domestic aircraft manufacturers in the late 1990s and early 2000s. The World Trade Organization decided that Brazil ran an illegal subsidy program, Proex, benefiting Brazilian manufacturer Embraer from at least 1999–2000; and that Canada illegally subsidized its indigenous regional airliner industry.

In late September 2017, the World Trade Organization announced that it would consider Brazil's complaint filed in February, including allegations that the Canadian government unfairly subsidized the CSeries. Embraer claimed that the subsidies are an "unsustainable practice that distorts the entire global market, harming competitors at the expense of Canadian taxpayers."

Boeing

2015–2017 government assistance

On 29 October 2015, the Quebec government announced that it would invest US$1 billion (roughly CAD$1.3 billion) to protect jobs and the CSeries, the province buying a 49.5% interest in the limited partnership controlling the CSeries program. Bombardier had reportedly asked Ottawa for a repayable loan of $350 million, while the province expected the federal government to match its $1 billion loan in return for a near 50 percent stake in the CSeries program. Debts from the project had forced Bombardier to raise cash and seek aid in order to stay afloat. Both provincial and federal contributions came via repayable loans; independent economist Mark Milke claimed it is questionable whether they would be repaid, calling the bailout loans "corporate welfare" in The Globe and Mail.

Days after his swearing-in, on 10 November 2015, Prime Minister Justin Trudeau stated Bombardier must make a "strong business case" for federal aid, agreeing that the firm exemplified important high value manufacturing, but stated that such aid would be shaped by Canadians' best interests, not on "emotion, politics or symbols". In April 2016, the federal government offered an aid package to Bombardier without disclosing the amount or conditions imposed; it reportedly rejected the offer. An unnamed source advised Reuters that negotiations were still underway. On 14 April 2016, Bombardier shares were at a six-month high over rumors that Delta had ordered CSeries jets. The firm continued to request a $1 billion aid package from the federal government.

In May 2016, the federal government reportedly offered a $1 billion aid package (in addition to the $1 billion subsidy offered by the Government of Quebec) with the condition of Bombardier ending its dual-class share structure which enables the Bombardier and Beaudoin families to control it despite a minority ownership. According to Bloomberg, the talks reached a standstill over this condition. The federal plan also recommended that the firm issue new shares to gain $1 billion in additional funding. The Toronto Star predicted that the government would bailout the firm as bankruptcy would lead to the loss of some 70,000 jobs as well as significant exports, which had totaled $34.2 billion in the previous five years. In May 2016, Federal Finance Minister Bill Morneau said the aerospace sector is "critically important". In February 2017, the federal government agreed to provide $372.5 million in interest-free repayable loans, to be issued in instalments over the following four years; one third was intended for the CSeries while the rest went to the Global 7000 business jet.

Airbus partnership 

On 16 October 2017, Bombardier and Airbus announced a partnership on the CSeries program to expand in an estimated market of more than 6,000 new 100-150 seat aircraft over 20 years; in July 2018, Airbus acquired a 50.01% majority stake in the holding company for the program, Bombardier keeping 31% and Investissement Québec 19%. Under this deal, the CSeries is now marketed as the Airbus A220. Access to Airbus's supply chain expertise is intended to save production costs while the headquarters and primary assembly line remain in Québec, while a second assembly line shall run at the Airbus Mobile factory in Alabama, US. Airbus did not pay for its share, nor did it assume any debt. Airbus insists that it has no plan to buy Bombardier's stake in the program, remaining strategic partners after 2025; clauses allow it to buy out Quebec's share in 2023 and Bombardier's seven years after the deal closes, though production is required to remain in Quebec until at least 2041. Bombardier CEO Alain Bellemare said the deal would raise sales: "It brings certainty to the future of the program so it increases the level of confidence that the aircraft is there to stay. Combining the CSeries with Airbus's global scale ... will take the CSeries program to new heights".

Divestment 

On 8 November 2018, Viking Air parent Longview Aviation Capital Corp. acquired the Q400 program and the de Havilland brand from Bombardier. Viking had already bought the discontinued de Havilland Canada aircraft type certificates in 2006. At that point, Q400 sales were lower than rival ATR Aircraft. Bombardier announced the sale was for $300 million and expected $250 million annual savings. The Q400 deal closed on 3 June 2019; the new holding company, De Havilland Aircraft of Canada Limited, inherited an order book of 51 Q400s. Also in late 2018, Bombardier sold its business jet training program to CAE Inc. for $645 million and announced 5,000 job cuts over 18 months across its 70,000 employees worldwide: 500 in Ontario, 2,500 in Quebec and 2,000 outside Canada.

Bombardier shifted focus from commercial to business aircraft, anticipating business jet shipments to increase from 135 in 2018 to 150-155 in 2019, and forecast revenues of $16.5 billion in 2018, rising to over $20 billion in 2020 with a free cash flow of $0.75-1 billion, mostly via the large Global 7500. Business Aircraft revenues were expected to increase from $5 billion for 2018 to $6.25 billion in 2019 and $8.5 billion in 2020 with 180 deliveries, including aftermarket within the 4,700 fleet doubling from the 28% captured in 2015. Aerostructures & Engineering Services were expected to grow from $2 billion in 2018 to $2.25 billion in 2020. Airliner revenues were expected to shrink from $1.7 billion to $1.4 billion in 2019, halving losses to $125 million, with deliveries flat at 35 CRJs and Q400s; it was to be profitable with CRJs only in 2020.

On 2 May 2019, Bombardier's aerospace division was renamed Bombardier Aviation following the divestment of the CSeries and Q400 programmes. On 25 June 2019, Bombardier agreed with Mitsubishi Heavy Industries to sell the CRJ program, a deal was expected to close in early 2020 subject to regulatory approval. Mitsubishi will gain Bombardier's global expertise in terms of engineering, certification, customer relations and support, boosting its SpaceJet (formerly MRJ) programme and enabling its production in North America. The deal includes two service centres in Canada and two in the US, as well as the CRJ's type certificates. Bombardier retains the Mirabel assembly facility and produce the CRJ on behalf of Mitsubishi until the current order backlog is complete. In early May 2020, Mitsubishi confirmed that all conditions had been met. The transaction closed on 1 June. Bombardier's CRJ-related service and support activities were transferred to a new Montreal-based company, MHI RJ Aviation Group.

On 31 October 2019, Bombardier announced the sale of its aerostructures activities and aftermarket services operations in Northern Ireland and Morocco, and its aerostructures maintenance, repair and overhaul (MRO) facility in Dallas, to Spirit AeroSystems. The sale was expected to close in the first half of 2020 subject to regulatory approval. In September 2020 Spirit said "there can be no assurances" that conditions would be met by the 31 October deadline. A last-minute amendment reduced the amount of the cash consideration and adjusted the overall valuation, enabling the parties to set a closing date of 30 October.

On 12 February 2020, Bombardier sold its share in Airbus Canada Limited Partnership, the holding company for the A220 programme, for $591 million; Airbus now has a 75% share, with the remaining 25% owned by Investissement Québec. This sale marked Bombardier's "strategic exit" from the commercial aviation sector.

Despite rumours that its business jet activities might be sold to Textron, parent company of Cessna and Bell Helicopters,  on 17 February it emerged that Bombardier had instead agreed to sell its rail division to Alstom and would focus exclusively on business aviation.

Aircraft

Current

Divested

Out of production 
Production ended at Bombardier, instead of after divestment

Facilities

Bombardier Aviation has several facilities.

Facilities history
Bombardier Aerospace once had manufacturing, engineering and services facilities in 27 countries. The production facilities are located in Canada, the United States, and Mexico.

On 3 May 2018, Bombardier announced the sale of its Toronto Downsview facility where it manufactures the Global business jet family and the Q400 regional turboprops, for $635 million, leased back for three to five years to maintain Q400 production, while leasing a  site at Toronto Pearson International Airport to open a final assembly plant for the Global business jets.
On 2 May 2019, Bombardier announced that all of its aerospace assets would be consolidated into a "single, streamlined and fully integrated business", resulting in the sale of its operations in Belfast and Morocco.

Current facilities

Canada 
 Montreal Trudeau International Airport — Headquarters. Challenger 300, 605 and 850 final assembly and flight test. Global family interior completion.
 Montréal Mirabel International Airport — CRJ700/CRJ900/CRJ1000 and A220 family final assembly and flight test.
 Saint-Laurent, Quebec — Product Development Centre. Cockpit and aft fuselage manufacturing facility.
 Toronto Pearson International Airport — Global family final assembly

Mexico 
 Querétaro — Aircraft component manufacturing facility for Learjet 85, Challenger 605, CRJ700/CRJ900/CRJ1000 NextGen, Q400 NextGen and Global 6000/7000.

United States 
 Wichita, Kansas — Learjet family final assembly and flight test.

Former facilities

Canada 
 Downsview Airport — Dash 8 final assembly and flight test.
 North Bay Airport — Bombardier CL-415 was the final assembly and flight test until production ended in 2015. After a lull in 2002, the plant was restarted by contractor Vortex Aerospace Services in 2005. While production has ended, Vortex continues to provide training for CL 415 at the facility.

Morocco 
 Casablanca (BP 197 Zone Franche Midparc next to Mohammed V International Airport) — Flight controls for CRJ series aircraft. Pending sale to Spirit AeroSystems in 2019.

United Kingdom 
 Belfast, Northern Ireland — Former Short Brothers plant across from Victoria Park near George Best Belfast City Airport. Aircraft fuselage, engine nacelle, wing manufacturing and assembly facility. Pending sale to Spirit AeroSystems in 2019.

Production 
Bombardier Aerospace fiscal or calendar year delivery of regional, business and amphibious aircraft:

Gallery

See also 
 Viking Air — Canadian manufacturer that purchased the type certificates from Bombardier for all discontinued de Havilland Canada designs.

Notes

References 

 Commercial Aircraft and Airline Markings by Christopher Chant.

External links 

 
 
 

Aircraft manufacturers of Canada
Aerospace
 
Multinational aircraft manufacturers
Science and technology in Canada
Aerospace companies of Canada
Companies based in Quebec
Emergency services equipment makers
Defence companies of Canada
Dorval